California's 4th district may refer to:

 California's 4th congressional district
 California's 4th State Assembly district
 California's 4th State Senate district